My is the sixth studio album by Polish recording artist Edyta Górniak, released through Anaconda Productions on February 14, 2012 (Valentine's Day).

Track listing

(*) Piotr Skotnicki, Piotr Remiszewski

References

2012 albums
Edyta Górniak albums